Ann Coody (December 12, 1937) is a politician from the U.S. state of Oklahoma. A member of the Republican Party, she was elected to the Oklahoma House of Representatives in 2004, and represented the 64th district until she was term limited in 2016. Before serving as Oklahoma State Representative, Coody was a longtime educator, counselor, and assistant principal for Lawton Public Schools. To date, Coody is the primary author of 125 bills.

Early life
Ann Coody was born in Shreveport, LA and lived there until she was twelve years old. The family moved to San Antonio, TX where her father was stationed at Randolph Air Force Base. Coody graduated from Alma Heights High School in San Antonio.

Education
Before departing for Hardin-Simmons University in Abilene, TX, Coody met her future husband, Dale Coody, on a blind date. He followed Ann to Hardin-Simmons and the two dated throughout her freshman year. Ann's father was transferred to Tachikawa Air Force base in Japan and she was expected to join her family there. After spending a year abroad, Coody returned to Hardin-Simmons and finished her Bachelor of Arts degree in speech and drama and minor in English.

Married life and career
Soon after graduation, Dale and Ann married and spent their first year in Seagraves, TX, while Dale served as the music and educational director at the First Baptist Church in Seagraves. The two moved around in Texas for a time before returning to Tulsa, OK in 1962. In 1963, after both of their children were born, Dale and Ann moved to Lawton, OK, where they have lived ever since. While teaching at Tomlinson high school, Coody received her Master's in guidance and counseling from the University of Oklahoma. Soon after, Coody was hired as the school counselor at MacArthur High School and remained there for 26 years. While in this position, Coody obtained her certificate in secondary education from the University of Oklahoma. After 9 years as the counselor, she was hired at MacArthur as the Assistant Principal. Eventually Coody was hired as the principal at MacArthur high school and served in that position for 9 years.

In 2000, Coody retired as principal after 39 years in education.

House of Representatives
Coody originally ran for office in 2002 as a registered Democrat and lost. In 2004, Coody was elected to the Oklahoma House of Representatives, and was the first female as well as the first Republican to hold the seat in her district (64th). During her first session, Coody got 4 of the 8 bills she presented passed into law. To date, Coody has been the primary author of 125 legislative bills. Coody was term limited in 2016.

Committees
Common Education, Chair
Conference Committee on Common Education, Chair
Appropriations & Budget
A&B Education
Conference Committee on Veterans & Military Affairs
General Conference Committee on Appropriations & Budget
Joint Committee on Appropriations & Budget
Veterans & Military Affairs

Community Involvement
Coody is also a member of various organizations, including:
American Legislative Exchange Council
Comanche County Retired Educators Association
Oklahoma Retired Educators Association
First Baptist Church of Grandfield, Oklahoma

References

Further reading

Women of the Oklahoma Legislature Oral History Project – OSU Library

1937 births
Politicians from Shreveport, Louisiana
University of Oklahoma alumni
Hardin–Simmons University alumni
Women state legislators in Oklahoma
Republican Party members of the Oklahoma House of Representatives
Living people
Educators from Oklahoma
People from Lawton, Oklahoma
21st-century American politicians
21st-century American women politicians
Educators from Louisiana
American women educators